Dahina  is a village in Rewari district, Haryana State, India, in Gurgaon Division. It is a Sub-Tehsil and a Block of Rewari District . Dahina is dominated by Yadav's of Khola and it is a popular pilgrimage place. The temple of Baba Keshav Das ji, Baba Jinda Dev, Mata Cheela and Baba Shayarwala are main pilgrimage sites in Dahina.Dahina is now  sub tahsil of Rewari . In Dahina A mini Sectt for registry etc. works are established. An 80-bed Govt Hospital and one veterinary hospital is already established in Dahina. Dahina has a 132 KV sub station of power electricity. In Dahina there are three financial institutions i.e. Central Bank of India, sarv haryana gramin bank and hdfc bank. Central Bank of India was oldest among them

Demographics of 2011
As of 2011 India census, Dahina, Rewari had a population of 7246 in 1521 households. Males (3741) constitute 51.62%  of the population (Janshankya) and females (3505) 48.37%. Dahina has an average literacy (5233) rate of 72.21%, lower than the national average of 74%: male literacy (3003) is 57.38%, and female literacy (2230) is 42.61% of total literates (5233). In Dahina, Rewari, 11.74% of the population is under 6 years of age (851). Dahina has many temples like Baba Zinda Dev mandir, Baba Shayrwala Mandir, Baba Haduman wala Mandir etc. Baba Zinda dev Mandir is famous for Baba Zinda, a Bhakta of BabaJaharveer Goga Ji Maharaj. In this temple you will get more spirituality and peace. There is now a  playground on the land of Baba Zinda Dev Mandir and one Stadium name as "KHEL STADIUM DAHINA " where Kabaddi and Athletic events are organised on special occasions.

Dahina block 
Here are the full list of villages of Dahina block.

References 

Villages in Rewari district